Ga-young is a Korean feminine given name. Its meaning differs based on the hanja used to write each syllable of the name. There are 31 hanja with the reading "ga" and 34 hanja with the reading "young" on the South Korean government's official list of hanja which may be registered for use in given names.

People with this name include:
Kim Ga-young (pool player) (born 1983), South Korean professional pool player
Kim Ga-young (actress) (born 1991), South Korean actress and singer, former member of girl group Stellar
Moon Ga-young (born 1996), German-born South Korean actress

Fictional characters with this name include:
Moon Ga-young, in 2004 South Korean television series Sweet 18
Park Ga-young, in 2006 South Korean television series Mystery 6
Yoo Ga-young, in 2008 South Korean film Romantic Island
Lee Ga-young, in 2012 South Korean television series Fashion King
Sung Ga-young, in 2021 South Korean Netflix series Squid Game

See also
List of Korean given names

References

Korean feminine given names